Martin's Location is a township in Coös County, New Hampshire, United States. As of the 2020 census, two people were reported as living in the location. It lies entirely within the White Mountain National Forest, and is the site of the Dolly Copp Campground.

In New Hampshire, locations, grants, townships (which are different from towns), and purchases are unincorporated portions of a county which are not part of any town and have limited self-government (if any, as many are uninhabited).

Geography 
The location straddles the Peabody River and New Hampshire Route 16 due east of Mount Madison, north of Green's Grant and bounded to the north by Gorham.

Via the north-flowing Peabody River, the location is part of the Androscoggin River watershed.

Demographics 

As of the 2020 census, there were two people living in the township.

References

Townships in Coös County, New Hampshire
Berlin, New Hampshire micropolitan area
Townships in New Hampshire